Sulaiman Bek is a town in Saladin Governorate, Iraq, located some 170 km (105 mi) north of Baghdad.

The town is populated by the Al-Nuaim, Jubur, Bani Az, Albu Salih and Al-Bayat tribe. The village of Hafriya is situated nearby.

References

Populated places in Saladin Governorate
Turkmen communities in Iraq